Fu-Hsing Semi-Express was a series of trains operated by the Taiwan Railway Administration from 1981 to 2022.

Fu-Hsing Semi-Express trains were introduced in 1981. They were the first to be built in Taiwan, and the first Taiwanese trains to have air conditioning. The Fu-Hsing'''s final journey took place on 29 March 2022, and ran from Hualien to Shulin.  Fu-Hsing trains were replaced by EMU500 and EMU900 series trains, and the Tze-chiang limited express. Fu-Hsing'' trains that could be refurbished were placed on the South-link line.

References

1981 establishments in Taiwan
2022 disestablishments in Taiwan
Named passenger trains
Taiwan Railways Administration